Claude A. Bray Jr. (July 14, 1931 – June 12, 2020) was an American lawyer and politician.

Bray was born in Grantville, Georgia. He moved with his family to Manchester, Georgia and graduated from Manchester High School. Bray graduated from University of Georgia School of Law and practiced law in Manchester, Georgia. Bray also served in the United States Air Force and was commissioned a second lieutenant. Bray served in the Georgia House of Representatives from 1967 to 1987 and was a Democrat. Bray died in Ellerslie, Georgia.

Notes

1931 births
2020 deaths
People from Coweta County, Georgia
People from Manchester, Georgia
Military personnel from Georgia (U.S. state)
University of Georgia School of Law alumni
Georgia (U.S. state) lawyers
Democratic Party members of the Georgia House of Representatives